Harold Heathcote Williams QC (19 September 1896 – 15 August 1964), was a British Liberal Party politician and barrister.

Background
He was the 9th son of Joseph Ellis Williams and Martha Amelia Heathcote, of Abbotsfield, Chester. He was educated at The King's School, Chester and Brasenose College, Oxford (Hulme Scholar). He received an Honours in Jurisprudence in 1922. He married, in 1940, Margaret Julian Henley. They had one son (poet, dramatist and actor John Henley Heathcote-Williams, known as 'Heathcote Williams') and one daughter.

Career
He served in the European War, 1914–19, in the Royal Artillery. He was editor of Isis, 1922–23. He was a barrister, having been called to the bar, Inner Temple, in 1923. He was appointed recorder of Tiverton in 1947 serving for the next 4 years. He became a Queen's Counsel in 1949. He was Master of the Bench of The Inner Temple in 1957. He was Legal Member of Council of the Town Planning Institute

Political career

He first stood as Liberal candidate at South Poplar in 1923, the first of three attempts to win the seat.

 

 
He then decided to seek election to parliament elsewhere and in June 1931 was chosen by Torquay Liberal Association as their prospective parliamentary candidate. However, a National Government was formed and the party was reluctant to oppose the sitting Conservative MP. At the 1935 General Election, he did fight Knutsford, finishing second. 

A General Election was expected to take place in 1939 or 1940 and Williams was again chosen by Knutsford Liberal Association as their prospective parliamentary candidate. He was actively campaigning in Knutsford, right up to the moment when war broke out. All party political activity was cut back during the war along with an Electoral truce that had been agreed by the main political parties. This meant that should their be a need to fill parliamentary vacancies, the incumbent party would not face opposition from the other parties. There was increasing dissatisfaction with this truce among both the Liberal and Labour parties which resulted in some Independent Labour or Independent Liberal candidates standing in by-elections against government candidates. Williams was one of these candidates. He contested the neighbouring Cheshire seat of Eddisbury, but polled poorly, as his own party leader Sir Archibald Sinclair publicly endorsed the government candidate;

This was Williams final parliamentary electoral contest.

References

1896 births
1964 deaths
Liberal Party (UK) parliamentary candidates
Members of the Inner Temple
People educated at The King's School, Chester
Alumni of Brasenose College, Oxford
Royal Artillery officers
British Army personnel of World War I
20th-century King's Counsel